Gabriel Wharton may refer to:

 Gabriel C. Wharton (1824–1906), American civil engineer and soldier
 Gabriel Caldwell Wharton (1839–1887), Union Army officer

See also 
 Gabriel Warton Lee (1880–1928), British geologist and palaeontologist